Langdon may refer to:

Places

Australia 
 Langdon, Queensland, a neighbourhood in the Mackay Region

Canada 

 Langdon, Alberta, a hamlet

United Kingdom 

 Langdon, Cornwall, a hamlet
 Langdon, Kent, a civil parish
 Langdon, Pembrokeshire

United States 

 Langdon, Iowa, an unincorporated community
 Langdon, Kansas, a city
 Langdon, a village which later became part of Cottage Grove, Minnesota
 Langdon, New Hampshire, a town
 Langdon, North Dakota, a city
 Langdon, Washington, D.C., a neighborhood
 Langdon, Minnesota, a former settlement
 Lake Langdon, Minnesota
 Langdon Lake, Oregon

As a name
 Langdon (surname), various people
 Langdon (given name), various people

Other uses
 Langdon Abbey, West Langdon, Kent, England
 Langdon Academy, a co-educational all-through school in the London Borough of Newham, England
 Langdon Hall, Auburn University, Auburn, Alabama, United States

See also
 East Langdon, Kent
 West Langdon, Kent
 Langdon Bay (Kent)
 Langdon Court, Devon, a former manor house
 Langdon Hills, Essex
 Landon, a variant spelling